Halls Stream or Rivière Hall is a  tributary of the Connecticut River in eastern North America. For most of its length, it forms the Canada–United States border, with the province of Quebec (Canada) to its west and the state of New Hampshire (United States) to its east.

Geography
The stream flows from north to south, with a logging landscape on the New Hampshire side, and a mixture of woodland and farms on the Quebec side. Near the southern end of the stream, the international boundary diverges from Halls Stream and heads west, along a line which, when it was originally surveyed, was intended to be on the 45th parallel. South of this line, Halls Stream enters the state of Vermont, flowing through the town of Canaan in Essex County for a little over a half mile. In the village of Beecher Falls, Vermont, it empties into the Connecticut River (which forms the boundary between Vermont and New Hampshire).

Where Halls Stream forms the international border, it divides the following municipalities:
 East side: Town of Pittsburg, Coos County, New Hampshire
 West side: Municipalities of Saint-Malo, Saint-Venant-de-Paquette, and East Hereford, in Coaticook Regional County Municipality, Estrie administrative region, Quebec

History
Historically, Halls Stream factored into an international boundary dispute in this area, and it formed part of the border of the so-called Republic of Indian Stream.

Toponymy
The term "Halls" is a surname of English origin.

The toponym "Rivière Hall" was officialized on December 5, 1968, at the Commission de toponymie du Québec (Quebec Geographical Names Board) and on October 29, 1980, in the United States Geographic Names Information System (GNIS).

See also 

 List of rivers of New Hampshire
 List of rivers of Quebec
 List of rivers of Vermont
 List of international border rivers

References

Rivers of New Hampshire
Rivers of Vermont
Rivers of Estrie
Rivers of Coös County, New Hampshire
Pittsburg, New Hampshire
Canada–United States border
Tributaries of the Connecticut River
International rivers of North America